Richard Berens may refer to:

 Richard Berens (cricketer, born 1801) (1801–1859), English amateur cricketer
 Richard Berens (cricketer, born 1864) (1864–1909), English cricketer and barrister